Hoseynabad-e Sheybani (also Romanized as Ḩoseynābād-e Sheybānī; also known as Kalāteh-ye Ḩamīdeh Khānom) is a village in Jolgeh-e Mazhan Rural District, Jolgeh-e Mazhan District, Khusf County, South Khorasan Province, Iran. At the 2006 census, its population was 50, in 15 families.

References 

Populated places in Khusf County